Kaligram is a second largest village in Chanchal-I Block of District Malda in the state of West Bengal, India. It is under Kaligram- Gram-Panchayat of The Block Chanchal-I of the district Malda. It falls under juridission of Chanchal police station . It dates back to Mughal Era. It is widely believed that a Mughal noble named Kali Khan came to this village and it was named after him. In the history of Bengal it was mentioned that Raja Ganesha fled from his capital by using the Kadali River in his way to Dinajpur. Kadla, named after the extinct river is in Kaligram.

The climate is rather Extreme  hot and sultry during summer season, with plentiful rains and moisture in the air throughout the year. Basically, there are four seasons in the year. The cold season start about the middle of November and continues till the end of February. The period from March to May is the summer season. The rainy season starts in June with the coming of south - west monsoons and continues till the middle of September. October and the first half of November constitutes the post monsoons season. The maximum precipitation occurs during the period from June to September

Kaligram is located at 25.383425°N 88.045163°E under Chanchal subdivision. Abhijnan

References

Villages in Malda district